Trixis inula, the tropical threefold, is a plant species native to Texas, Mexico, Central America, northern South America, and the West Indies. It is found on open, sandy sites such as roadsides, thorn scrub, thickets, etc.

Trixis inula is a much-branched shrub up to 300 cm (10 feet) tall. It has lanceolate to elliptic leaves up to 17 cm (7 inches) long. Yellow flower heads are borne in paniculate arrays.

References

inula
Flora of Texas
Flora of Mexico
Flora of Central America
Flora of Colombia
Flora of Venezuela